Susan Eapen is an Indian plant biology and botany scientist. She is one of the pioneers in transgenic plant research. She was the president of Indian Women Scientists’ Association. Dr Eapen was included by Stanford University in the list of top-ranking scientists in the world in the "Plant Biology and Botany" category.

References 

21st-century Indian women scientists
21st-century Indian scientists
Living people
Year of birth missing (living people)
Maharaja's College, Ernakulam alumni
University of Kerala alumni
University of Mysore alumni